Kinmylies is an area in the west end of the city of Inverness in the Scottish Highlands. The area sits between the side of the hill Craig Phadrig (Gaelic for Patrick's Rock); and the Caledonian Canal. The local football team was Caledonian F.C. until they merged with another team (Inverness Thistle) to form Inverness Caledonian Thistle and moved out of the area.

The name Kinmylies originates from the Scots Gaelic Ceann a' Mhìlidh, meaning Head (or place) of the Warriors. The area appears in the 1841 census onwards but in the 1970s became built up initially as housing for key workers, who were encouraged to move to the area to aid its growth. 
Kinmylies houses Charleston Academy; a secondary School with a local catchment area, and additionally villages surrounding the city; such as Beauly and Drumnadrochit. The area also shares its name with the local primary school, Kinmylies Primary. It is the hometown of actress Karen Gillan.

Kinmylies Parish Church and Kinmylies Medical Practice are in proximity to the schools; both built in the 1990s.

Kinmylies Church of Scotland
Kinmylies Primary School
Kinmylies Medical Practice

Areas of Inverness